The 2022 Big South Conference women's soccer tournament was the postseason women's soccer tournament for the Big South Conference held from November 3 through November 6, 2022. The tournament was hosted by the Sportsplex at Matthews in Matthews, North Carolina. The four team-team single-elimination tournament consisted of two rounds based on seeding from regular season conference play. High Point were the defending champions, and they were unable to defend their crown, as they failed to qualify for the tournament, finishing in fifth place.  Radford won the tournament with a 3–0 victory over USC Upstate in the Final.  The conference tournament title was the eighth for the Radford women's soccer program, all of which have come under head coach Ben Sohrabi.  As tournament champions, Radford earned the Big South's automatic berth into the 2022 NCAA Division I women's soccer tournament.

Seeding 
The top four teams in the regular season earned a spot in the tournament.  A tiebreaker was required to determine the second and third seeds as USC Upstate and Radford both finished with identical 6–2–1 conference regular season records.  USC Upstate earned the second seed by virtue of their 2–0 victory over Radford on October 4th.

Bracket

Source:

Schedule

Semifinals

Final

Statistics

Goalscorers

All-Tournament team

Source:

MVP in bold

References 

2022 Big South Conference women's soccer season
Big South Conference Women's Soccer Tournament